The 2020–21 Polish Basketball League (PLK) season, the Energa Basket Liga for sponsorship reasons, was the 87th season of the Polish Basketball League, the highest professional basketball league in Poland. Stelmet Enea Zielona Góra were the defending champions.

Arged BM Slam Stal Ostrów Wielkopolski won its first ever national championship.

Teams 
16 teams will participate this season. Due to the coronavirus pandemic, there were no relegation or promotion.

Locations and venues

Regular season

League table

Results

Playoffs
Quarterfinals and semifinals are played in a best-of-five format (2–2–1) while the finals in a best-of-seven one (2–2–1–1–1).

Bracket

Quarterfinals

|}

Semifinals

|}

Third place series

|}

Finals

|}

Awards
All official awards of the 2020–21 PLK season.

Season awards

MVP of the Round

MVP of the Month

Polish clubs in European competitions

Polish clubs in Regional competitions

References

External links
Polska Liga Koszykówki - Official Site 
Polish League at Eurobasket.com

Polish Basketball League seasons
Poland
PLK